Kallal is a village in Sivaganga District of Tamil Nadu in India. Kallal block Panchayat is one of the 12 block Panchayat coming under Sivaganga District administration of Tamil Nadu state in India.   Kallal is well connected by both Road transport and Rail network. Both state owned TNSTC and Private Omni Bus services are operated  from Kallal to different parts of Tamil Nadu state.

Geography
The mean elevation is 85 metres.

Education
There are three higher secondary schools:
Shanti Rani Matric Higher Secondary School
Britto Higher Secondary School
Murugappa Higher Secondary School

References

Villages in Sivaganga district